Josip Maria Kodl (8 September 1887 – 26 September 1971) was a Croatian architect. Born in Zdice in the present-day Czech Republic, Kodl graduated from the Higher Technical School in Prague, after which he moved to Split where he would spend the remainder of his life. Kodl's work included a number of public projects, such as the Municipal House (1924), Meteorological Observatory on the Marjan (1926) and the "Manuš-Dobri" Elementary School (1930), as well as numerous private homes across Split.

Kodl was also active as a sportsperson; he was one of the founders of the HVK Gusar rowing club and an active rower himself, having competed in numerous races and state championships.

Footnotes

References 

Yugoslav architects
People from Split, Croatia
1887 births
1971 deaths
Burials at Lovrinac Cemetery